Mary Frances Moore (March 6, 1922 – July 12, 1962) was a pitcher who played in the All-American Girls Professional Baseball League. She was born in Lemon Grove, California.

Moore spent one season in the league with the 1948 Rockford Peaches champion team. She posted a 2-3 pitching record in eight games and batted an average of .222 (4-for-18).

She died in 1962 in her home of Lemon Grove, California, at the age of 40.

In 1988 was inaugurated a permanent display at the Baseball Hall of Fame and Museum in Cooperstown, New York that honors those who were part of the All-American Girls Professional Baseball League. Mary Moore, along with the rest of the girls and the league staff, is included at the display/exhibit.

Pitching statistics

Sources

1942 births
1986 deaths
All-American Girls Professional Baseball League players
Baseball players from California
People from Lemon Grove, California
20th-century American women